First Strike is the debut and sole studio album released by Swiss-American hard rock band Cobra.  Originally released in 1983 by Epic Records, the record was produced by Tom Allom and remastered in 2008 by Rock Candy. The album in the British music magazine Kerrang! took first place in the import charts. The single "Blood on Your Money" received MTV airplay, while "Looking at You" and "Travelin' Man" received promotion at the Memphis TV Club.

Swiss hard rock band Gotthard covered "Travelin' Man" on their 1994 album, Dial Hard, and "Looking at You" for One Life One Soul - Best of Ballads in 2002. Cobra guitarist Mandy Meyer was a member of Gotthard between 1996 and 2003.

Track listing

Personnel 
 Jimi Jamison – Lead Vocals
 Mandy Meyer – Lead Guitar
 Tommy Keiser – Bass
 Jack Holder – Guitar & Keyboards
 Jeff Klaven – Drums

References 

1983 debut albums
Epic Records albums
Albums produced by Tom Allom